Eastern Motorway may refer to various motorways, including:

Tauranga Eastern Motorway, Tauranga, New Zealand
Eastern Transport Corridor, a planned but since cancelled new motorway in Auckland, New Zealand
Ostautobahn, a motorway in the east of Austria